Bob Gordon Jones (born August 22, 1932) is an American prelate of the Episcopal Church, who served as the Bishop of Wyoming between 1977 and 1996.

Early life and education
Jones was born on August 22, 1932, in Paragould, Arkansas, the son of F. H. Jones and Helen Truman Ellis. He graduated with a Bachelor of Business Administration degree from the University of Mississippi in 1956 and a Master of Divinity degree from the Seminary of the Southwest in 1959. The seminary also awarded him a Doctor of Divinity degree in 1978. Jones served in the United States Navy during the Korean War from 1950 and 1955.

Ordained ministry
Jones was ordained deacon on June 29, 1959, and became assistant to the Dean of Trinity Cathedral in Little Rock, Arkansas. Whilst there, he was ordained a priest in 1960. In 1962 he left for Alaska, where he became vicar of the Church of St George-in-Arctic in Kotzebue, Alaska. In 1967, he became rector and vicar of St Christopher's Church in Anchorage, Alaska, where he remained until 1977.

Bishop
Jones was elected Bishop of Wyoming on the fourth ballot of a special convention held on June 25, 1977. He was then consecrated on October 31, 1977, by Presiding Bishop John Allin. He retired in 1996.

References

Living people
1932 births
20th-century American Episcopalians
People from Paragould, Arkansas
University of Mississippi alumni
Seminary of the Southwest alumni
Episcopal bishops of Wyoming